Ernie Cunnigan (born June 10, 1959), better known by his stage name Ernie C, is an American musician best known as the guitarist of rap metal band Body Count.

Early life
Cunnigan grew up in Compton, California and attended Crenshaw High School with Ice-T. Cunnigan was one of the few students attending the school who was interested in rock music. His uncle was an important influence. He introduced Cunnigan to different groups and a diverse number of styles in the genre. Cunnigan became an enthusiastic fan, eventually buying a guitar from his local music store. He dedicated himself to learning, starting at 12. He was entirely self-taught.

Cunnigan's guitar playing and showmanship earned him respect among his fellow students, including members of the Crips gang. He also taught guitar to fellow students, including D-Roc the Executioner, who later joined Body Count.

Career
Cunnigan and Body Count bandmate Ice-T co-wrote the song "Cop Killer". Cunnigan also produced demo tapes that led to the signings of Stone Temple Pilots and Rage Against the Machine, as well as the Forbidden album for Black Sabbath.

As part of the Body Count, Cunnigan received his first Grammy Award for Best Metal Performance nomination in 2017 at the 60th Annual Grammy Awards for the song "Black Hoodie" from the band's sixth studio album, Bloodlust. He managed to win at the 63rd Annual Grammy Awards ceremony, which was held on March 14, 2021, when he was nominated for the second time for the song "Bum-Rush" from the group's seventh album Carnivore.

Discography
 The Iceberg/Freedom of Speech... Just Watch What You Say! (1989)
 Body Count (1992)
 Born Dead (1994)
 Violent Demise: The Last Days (1997)
 Murder 4 Hire (2006)
 Manslaughter (2014)
 Bloodlust (2017)
 Carnivore (2020)

Videography
Murder 4 Hire (2004)
Live in LA (2005)
Smoke Out Festival Presents: Body Count (2005)

Awards and nominations 

!
|-
|align=center|2017
|"Black Hoodie"
| rowspan="2"| Grammy Award for Best Metal Performance
|
|
|-
|align=center|2020
|"Bum-Rush"
|
|
|-

References

External links
Ernie C on Facebook
Ernie C on Twitter
Ernie C on Myspace

1959 births
Living people
Lead guitarists
Grammy Award winners
American male guitarists
Body Count (band) members
Guitarists from California
African-American guitarists
Crenshaw High School alumni
African-American rock musicians
American heavy metal guitarists
20th-century American guitarists
Musicians from Compton, California